This is a list of  extinct native Japanese horse breeds.

Notes

References

See also 
 List of Japanese horse breeds

Extinct horse breeds
Extinct animals of Japan
Lists of Japanese domestic animal breeds